Paul Papp (born 11 November 1989) is a Romanian professional footballer who plays as a centre-back or a right-back for Liga I club Petrolul Ploiești.

Club career

Unirea Dej
Born in Dej, Papp started out playing for hometown team Unirea.

Botoşani
In June 2008, Papp and teammate Adrian Boroştean were signed by FC Botoşani. At age 18, he wore the captain's armband, right on his league debut for his new team. He led his team to a 2–1 win against Dunărea Giurgiu. Two months later he led his team to a historical qualification to Romanian Cup's eighth finals, the highest performance for the past 20 years for Botoşani. Despite his team's up and down half season, Papp was voted the best central defender from Liga II by the reader of liga2.ro website In mid-2009 rumours began circulating that the club were in dire financial trouble and that new manager Alin Bejan would be forced to part with his star players for a substantial amount of cash. Although he was not on the transfer list, following his solid performances for Botoşani, many Liga I clubs linked the young defender.

Vaslui
In February 2009, Papp and teammate Marius Ştefoi were signed by Vaslui that acquired 85% of the players rights. Papp made his Vaslui first-team debut on 17 May 2009 in a match against CS Otopeni as a late substitute for Marko Ljubinković. Struggling to find himself in Vaslui's first-team, on 9 September Papp was loaned out to Farul Constanţa in order to gain experience. Papp's career began to take-off when he was recalled from his loan due to his progress at Farul and was pushed into the first-team. On 1 February 2010, Papp was seen as a straight replacement for Dinamo captain Tamaș, after his departure, but Marius Lăcătuș rejected any offer for the young defender. On 21 February, he was in the startup team against Gaz Metan Mediaş, being handed the no. 3 shirt. On 22 March, he scored his first three-points goal for Vaslui, against Rapid București. He scored his second goal on 10 May in a 2–1 win against Steaua București, Papp scoring Vaslui's second 8 minutes until the final whistle. He missed a single match during the 2009–10 campaign, due to yellow card accumulation, and helped his team reaching the 3rd place in Liga I, and the Romanian Cup final, eventually lost at the penalty shootout. He played 120 full minutes, on 26 May, against CFR Cluj in the Romanian Cup final, and he was declared the Man of the Match by the Romanian Football Federation.

Papp shrugged off the utility tag and established himself as a centre half. He scored his season's first goal on 14 August, in a league match against FC Brașov. The final score was 2–1, with Papp scoring Vaslui's first with a header from Lucian Sânmărtean's corner. On 19 August, he made his European debut, playing 90 full minutes against French side Lille OSC. On 22 September, he partnered Gabriel Cânu in the central defense, for the first time. Vaslui conceding only 15 goals with Papp and 
Cânu in the startup team. He scored his fourth league goal for Vaslui on 6 November, in a 1–2 loss against FC Timişoara. He scored Vaslui's only goal with a volley from Adaílton's corner. One week later, he captained Vaslui for the first time, following Cânu's red card received in the previous round. On 6 December, Papp was awarded the Defender of The Year award from FRF at the Romanian Football Ceremony from Bucharest. On 7 March 2011, Papp scored a headed goal for Vaslui against 
Universitatea Cluj in his second league appearance from 2011 whilst making his appearance in an unfamiliar right-back position. Following Luz's long term-injury and Bălace's bad shape, Milanov was sent to play on the left side and Papp on the right. However, he was sent back in the central defense, following his unsuccessful try out. In his second season since his establishment in the first-team, he finished third with his team, for the second year in a row.

Following his injury suffered at Romania's training, Papp missed the Sparta Prague double. However, it is believed that he will be fit to play in the UEFA Europa League Group Stages. He made his come-back on 22 September, wearing the captain's armband and leading his team to an emphatic 8–0 victory over Voinţa Livezile, in the Romanian Cup.

Chievo Verona
On 31 May, Chievo Verona reported that they have signed Romanian international, Paul Papp for an undisclosed fee.

Later that day, Vaslui owner Adrian Porumboiu confirmed that Chievo Verona acquired 75% of the player's rights. Media reports estimated the transfer fee to be between €1.5 million and €2.5 million.

On 7 April 2013, Papp scored his first goal in Serie A, in an away game against Udinese, to make 1–2 in an eventual 3–1 loss.

Astra Giurgiu
On 26 January 2014, he went on loan to Astra Giurgiu for the remainder of the season. He scored the winning goal against Petrolul Ploiești in the second leg of the semi-final to qualify Astra who would then win the final against Steaua Bucharest on penalties.

Steaua București
On 29 August 2014, he went on loan to Steaua for one season with buy option. After a good start of season, which brought him back to the attention of the national team, Steaua offered him a contract for five seasons.

International career

In October 2007 he was called up to the Romania Under-19 squad for the first time.

Following his successful loan to Farul, he was called up for the Romania Under-21 on 7 November 2009. Papp scored his first goal for the Romania Under-21 side, right on his debut match, in a qualification game for the 2011 European Under-21 Championship, against Latvia. He captained his side for the first time, following Torje and Găman's injuries, on 29 May 2010, in the friendly match, lost by Romania against Belarus. On 7 September, Papp was in the startup team for Romania U-21, in a 3–0 win against Russia. The win secured Romania a place in the playoff stage of the 2011 European Under-21 Championship qualifiers. However, he missed the chance to play at the 2011 European Under-21 Championship, after Romania lost the play-off over England.

The draw against England, was also his last match for Romania U-21, because on 28 January 2011, Papp was called up for the first time for the senior team of Romania. On 8 February 2011, he made his full debut for Romania, in a draw against Ukraine. He missed the second penalty from the penalty shootout. He played his first official match for Romania, in a qualification game for UEFA Euro 2012 against Bosnia and Herzegovina. On 8 June, he was in the startup team against Brazil in the Testimonial game of Ronaldo. On 5 August, Papp suffered a meniscus tear while he was training for Romania. The injury will force him out from the field for almost two months.

Career statistics

Club

International

International goals
Scores and results list Romania's goal tally first.

Honours
Vaslui
Cupa României runner-up: 2009–10

Astra Giurgiu
Cupa României: 2013–14

Steaua București
Liga I: 2014–15
Cupa României: 2014–15
Cupa Ligii: 2014–15, 2015–16

Universitatea Craiova
Cupa României: 2020–21
Supercupa României: 2021

References

External links

Paul Papp at FRF

1989 births
Living people
People from Dej
Romanian sportspeople of Hungarian descent
Romanian footballers
Romanian expatriate footballers
Association football defenders
Romania international footballers
Romania under-21 international footballers
FC Unirea Dej players
FC Botoșani players
FC Vaslui players
FC Astra Giurgiu players
FCV Farul Constanța players
A.C. ChievoVerona players
FC Steaua București players
FC Wil players
Kardemir Karabükspor footballers
Sivasspor footballers
CS Universitatea Craiova players
FC Petrolul Ploiești players
Liga I players
Serie A players
Swiss Challenge League players
Süper Lig players
Expatriate footballers in Italy
Expatriate footballers in Switzerland
Expatriate footballers in Turkey
Romanian expatriate sportspeople in Italy